North Arapaho Peak is the highest summit of the Indian Peaks in the northern Front Range of the Rocky Mountains of North America.

Between North Arapaho Peak and neighboring South Arapaho Peak sits Arapaho Glacier, which is owned by the City of Boulder as part of its water supply.  North and South Arapahoe Peaks are connected by a 0.8 mile, Class 4 connecting ridge. West of these peaks is Arapaho Pass.

Mountain

Historical names
Arapaho Peak
North Arapaho Peak

See also

List of mountain peaks of North America
List of mountain peaks of the United States
List of mountain peaks of Colorado

References

External links

Mountains of Colorado
Mountains of Boulder County, Colorado
Mountains of Grand County, Colorado
Arapaho National Forest
Roosevelt National Forest
Great Divide of North America
North American 4000 m summits